Courtenay Felix Bartholomew (1931 – 7 May 2021) was a Trinidad and Tobago physician, scientist, and author. He was the founder and director of the Medical Research Foundation of Trinidad and Tobago. He was active in HIV/AIDS research, and was notable for diagnosing the first case of AIDS in the English-speaking Caribbean. He also led HIV vaccine trials and research on retroviruses with US institutions.

Early life and education 
Courtenay Bartholomew was born in 1931 and grew up in Port of Spain, Trinidad and Tobago. He attended Nelson Street Boys’ RC School and St. Mary’s College. He had a keen interest in biology and chemistry, but disliked physics: his dream was to become a physician. Two people inspired him the most: Dr. Aldwin Gerard Francis and his own uncle, who also wanted to become a physician but was forced to abandon this dream due to racial prejudice in Canada.

In 1960, Bartholomew graduated from University College Dublin where he studied internal medicine. In 1964, he obtained a specialty degree in gastroenterology from the Royal College of Physicians of Edinburgh, making him the first West Indian to obtain  a degree in gastroenterology. In 1965, he obtained a Doctorate in Medicine from the National University of Ireland.

Academic career 
In 1967, Bartholomew became the first lecturer in Medicine at The University of the West Indies (St. Augustine Campus). In 1977, he became the first Professor of Medicine at the University of the West Indies (St. Augustine Campus).

Bartholomew researched HIV and AIDS. He diagnosed the first case of AIDS in the English-speaking Caribbean. He led HIV vaccine trials and research on retroviruses with US institutions. He also studied internal diseases, scorpion sting venom, acute pancreatitis, Hepatitis A and B. He was the first local physician to become a member of the Royal College of Physicians, London without examination.  He held Fellowships from the Royal Colleges of Ireland, Edinburgh and London.

He received University College Dublin’s highest honour of Honorary Fellowship of the Faculty of Medicine (2004) and the International Human Retrovirology Society Award (1991) for his outstanding contributions to medicine.

He was a member of the World AIDS Foundation Scientific Advisory Committee and an advocate for public education on AIDS.

Bartholomew was an advocate for fostering education and the use of libraries. He encouraged students to "be good at whatever you do", urged scientists to "be inquisitive to want to learn more" and highlighted the importance of teachers, as “teachers are there to guide and motivate”.

Religious activity 
Bartholomew restored several churches in Trinidad. He authored several books focusing on Mary, mother of Jesus, including three titles including the phrase "A Scientist Researches Mary".

Death
Bartholomew died on 7 May 2021, at the age of 89.

Honours and awards 
University College Dublin Honorary Fellowship of the Faculty of Medicine
International Human Retrovirology Society Award
Membership of the Royal College of Physicians, London
Chaconia Gold Medal, Government of Trinidad and Tobago
Order of the Republic of Trinidad and Tobago

Bibliography 
 A Scientist Researches Mary: The Ark of the Covenant (1995) 
 A Scientist Researches Mary, Mother and Coredemptrix (1998) 
 A Scientist Researches Mary, Mother of All Nations (1999) 
 Her Majesty Mary, Queen of Peace: End Times Prophecies and Warnings of Mary (2002) 
 The Immaculate Heart of Mary, Jesus Eucharist and Mother Seton's Emmitsburg (2003) 
 The Passion of the Christ and His Mother: Including the Linkage with Exodus and the Night of the Passover (2004) 
 The Last Help Before the End of Time: The Ultimate Message of Fatima (2005) 
 The End of This Era: A Linkage of Science and Religion (2009)

References

1931 births
2021 deaths
Trinidad and Tobago scientists
Trinidad and Tobago writers
Alumni of University College Dublin
University of the West Indies academics
Fellows of the Royal College of Physicians
Fellows of the Royal College of Physicians of Edinburgh
Recipients of the Order of the Republic of Trinidad and Tobago
Recipients of the Chaconia Medal
People from Port of Spain